The 2015–16 Superliga was the 60th season of the Polish Superliga, the top men's handball league in Poland. A total of twelve teams contested this season's league, which began on 2 September 2015 and concluded on 18 May 2016. 

Vive Tauron Kielce won their 13th title of the Polish Champions.

Format

Regular season

Standings

Results

Relegation round

Standings

Results

Playoffs

|}

Playoffs

Final standings

References

External links
 Official website 

Poland
Superliga
Superliga
Superliga
Superliga